In enzymology, a N-acetylglucosamine deacetylase is an enzyme that catalyzes the chemical reaction

N-acetyl-D-glucosamine + H2O  D-glucosamine + acetate

Thus, the two substrates of this enzyme are N-acetyl-D-glucosamine and H2O, whereas its two products are D-glucosamine and acetate.

This enzyme belongs to the family of hydrolases, those acting on carbon-nitrogen bonds other than peptide bonds, specifically in linear amides.  The systematic name of this enzyme class is N-acetyl-D-glucosamine amidohydrolase. Other names in common use include acetylaminodeoxyglucose acetylhydrolase, and N-acetyl-D-glucosaminyl N-deacetylase.  This enzyme participates in aminosugars metabolism.

Structural studies

References 

 

EC 3.5.1
Enzymes of known structure